Peter Joseph Hanlon (born 13 April 1959 in Dublin) is a retired British boxer.

Boxing career
Hanlon won the 1979 and 1981 Amateur Boxing Association British featherweight titles, when boxing out of the Gloucester ABC.

He competed in the men's featherweight event at the 1980 Summer Olympics. At the Olympics, he beat Antonio Esparragoza of Venezuela, before losing to Viktor Rybakov of the Soviet Union in the last 16.

He represented England and won a silver medal in the featherweight division, at the 1982 Commonwealth Games in Brisbane, Queensland, Australia.

References

External links
 

1959 births
Living people
British male boxers
Olympic boxers of Great Britain
Boxers at the 1980 Summer Olympics
Commonwealth Games medallists in boxing
Boxers at the 1982 Commonwealth Games
Commonwealth Games silver medallists for England
Featherweight boxers
20th-century British people
21st-century British people
Medallists at the 1982 Commonwealth Games